Dendrelaphis formosus, also known as the beautiful bronzeback tree snake, is a snake species in the family Colubridae.

Distribution and habitat

The beautiful bronzeback tree snake is native from southern Thailand, Peninsular Malaysia to the islands of Sumatra, Borneo and Java.

References

External links 

formosus
Snakes of Southeast Asia
Reptiles of Borneo
Reptiles of Brunei
Reptiles of Malaysia
Reptiles of Indonesia
Reptiles of Singapore
Reptiles of Thailand
Reptiles described in 1827
Taxa named by Friedrich Boie